Chamossaire may refer to:

 Le Chamossaire, a mountain in the Swiss Alps
 Chamossaire (horse), a British Thoroughbred racehorse